The following is a list of the MuchMusic Video Awards winners and nominees for Best Video.

1990s

2000s

2010s

References

Best Video